Lund Observatory is the official English name for the astronomy department at Lund University. Between 1867-2001 "Lund Observatory" was also the name of the Observatory building, which is now referred to as the "Lund Old Observatory". As of January 2010, Lund Observatory is part of the Department of Astronomy and Theoretical Physics at Lund University. It is located in Lund, Sweden.

History 
The institution was founded in 1749, but was preceded by an observatory built by astronomy professor Anders Spole (the grandfather of Anders Celsius) in 1672, which was destroyed at the Battle of Lund in 1676. The now old observatory from 1867 is located in a cultural-heritage protected observatory park just outside the medieval city boundaries. The department left these premises in 2001 for a new building on the northern campus of Lund University, inaugurated in 2001, using the nearby old water tower as their new location for astronomical observations. The history of astronomy in Lund through five centuries is told in the book Lundaögon mot stjärnorna

Activities 
Today Lund Observatory research activity focuses on observational and theoretical astrophysics. Areas covered include galaxy formation and evolution, exoplanet research, laboratory astrophysics, high-energy astrophysics, star clusters, and astrometry (Hipparcos and Gaia).

The Lund Panorama of the Milky Way 
Towards the middle 20th century astronomer professor Knut Lundmark, of the Lund Observatory in Sweden, supervised the two engineers Martin Kesküla and Tatjana Kesküla who painstakingly mapped the positions of about 7000 individual stars to create an unprecedented drawing of the Milky Way.

Lund University Planetarium 
The department runs a planetarium in Vattenhallen Science Center.

The planetarium started in 1978 in what is now called the Old Observatory. This site saw the premiere of the first planetarium version of Aniara, the epic sci-fi poem written by Swedish Nobel laureate Harry Martinson, in 1988.

Between 2001 and the inauguration of the Vattenhallen in 2010 the planetarium was housed in the city's old water tower.

See also 
809 Lundia

References

External links 
 Lund Observatory
 Lund Panorama of the Milky Way

Astronomical observatories in Sweden
Lund University
Buildings and structures in Lund
1749 establishments in Sweden